Laminaria ochroleuca is a large kelp, an alga in the order Laminariales. They are commonly known as golden kelp, due to their blade colouration, distinguishing them from Laminaria hyperborea

Description
This large brown alga can grow to a length of 2 m. It has large leathery blades or fronds which grow from a stipe. The blade is without a midrib and divided into smooth linear sections. The stipe is stalk-like, stiff, smooth and attached to rocks by a claw-like holdfast. It is similar to Laminaria hyperborea but it is more yellow in colour and does not have the rough stipe of L. hyperborea.

Reproduction
The life-cycle is of the large diploid sporophyte alternating with the microscopic haploid stages producing female gametophytes which are fertilized by male gametophytes (sperm).

Distribution
This species is found in the Northern Hemisphere, from Morocco to the south of England  In the UK, it was first documented in Plymouth Sound in 1946  and its range expansion continues due to climate change. It was found on the northeast coast of England beyond the Humber estuary before 1965.

References

Laminariaceae
Marine biota of Europe